= Spidernaut =

Extra-vehicular robot concept

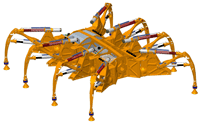
NASA Spidernaut robot render.

The Spidernaut is a concept for an extra-vehicular robot developed by NASA's Lyndon B. Johnson Space Center.

The Spidernaut was originally developed and designed in 2005 as part of a group of robots designed to assemble solar arrays on the moon, working as a team independent of human control. As upcoming space science platforms and vehicles are considered unwieldy to launch constructed as self-contained payloads, the ability to constructing and maintaining these structures in orbit presents unique challenges which may be overcome by Extra-Vehicular Robotics (EVR), such as the Spidernaut. The usage of multiple legs allows for more gentle and even distribution of loads while EVRs climb across space platforms, and mitigate torques which may spin the platform.

The design of the Spidernaut's software was led by a team at Carnegie Mellon University, which included ensuring that the programming of the spidernaut would not result in any major problems, such as trapping itself inside a structure it has built. Three prototype Spidernauts were completed in 2005 within the span of nine months.
